This is a list of episodes of The Late Late Show.

2000s

2008–2009

2009–2010

2010s

2010–2011

2011–2012

2012–2013

2013–2014

2014–2015

2015–2016

References

Episodes
Lists of Irish television series episodes
RTÉ-related lists